Su Yunying (born 8 April 1991), also known as Sue Su, is a Chinese singer-songwriter of Li ethnicity.

Su was born and raised in Sanya, Hainan. Su rose to prominence in 2015 on Sing My Song, performing her own written debut song called "Yezi" (which could be translated as "The Wild") and won second place.

Su also participated in the 2016 season of the Hunan Television show I Am a Singer Season 4.

Early life and education 
Su Yunying is a native of the Li nationality in Hainan province. She grew up at the seaside and yearned for freedom. As she was a child with Li folk songs, she gradually fell in love with singing. Su Yunying's mother also likes singing, which has a great influence on her. After finding that her daughter was interested in singing, she often taught her to sing.

Su Yunying graduated from Beijing Contemporary Music Academy in 2014. She was admitted to the Chinese Singing Department of the School, and began to learn folk songs. After her sophomore year, she transferred to the pop singing department . Yi Jiangfeng, the head of the department, became her teacher, which benefited her a lot in music.

During the winter vacation of her senior year, Su Yunying returned home in Sanya and wrote her first song "Heart" for the people she secretly missed."I really like the heart that I like him, but we don't have to be together," Su said.Just like I like the feeling of following him and stepping on his shadow after school. Just very coincidentally, that feeling is because of him."

Su Yunying did not know how to arrange music and was not good at Musical Instruments. She happened to meet two boys who knew music, so she formed the first band, renting a house together and playing with each other.Although the band broke up within a few months due to practical problems and the three also went apart, Su Yunying benefited very much from it and opened the door to the new century.

Career 
On January 2, 2015, Su Yunying signed up for the second season of "Sing My Song". She sang the original song "Yezi" in the first phase of the blind audition. She joined the Cai Jianya team to receive her guidance, and later won the first main seat in the Cai Jianya team with the original song "Fireflies".

On June 13, 2015, Su signed with Sony Music Entertainment, and joined the "Made" music project jointly created by Sony Music, Dream Sound Music and Taihe Music. LeTV Music provides exclusive video push for "Made" project, covering the widest area, the largest scale, and the largest number of participants in the series of LIVE performances. "Made" project creates more opportunities and influence for the development of original forces in the Chinese music scene.

On August 14, 2015, Su released her original single "Firefly", which was included in the compilation album "Xin Yuzhou". On August 21, she released her original single "Yezi", which was included in the compilation of "Top Ten Golden Songs of the 2nd Sing My Song". On December 26, she released her original single "2-0+1". On December 29, she released her first solo creative album "Ming Ming", which includes 10 songs including "Scent of the Fantasy" and "Imagery Inside Our Hearts".

In June 2016, Su released her original single "Xin Xin" as the theme song of the animated movie "Toys War". On June 19, she held her first concert "Yezi - The power to grow wildly" at the Beizhan Theater. On July 6, she released the promotional song "Then" for the movie "Never Gone".

On January 11, 2017, Su released her solo single "Dongfang Bubai". On April 7, she sang the Chinese promotion song "Lan Haizi" for the animated movie "Smurfs: The Lost Village". On May 15, she released her solo cover single "Lu Guo Wo Er Duo De You Shang", which was included in Qin Zhen's memorial album "Qing Zhen".

On December 13, 2018, Su released her second solo music album "Fairyland", featuring 12 songs including "IS" and "You Too?".

On July 19, 2020, Su released the promotional song "Tianya Weijia", which was performed with Chen Chusheng for the 6th Asian Beach Games.

On January 20, 2021, Su released her solo single "Nan Yan". On July 12, she sang the ending song "Wo Men" for the web series "Bei Zhe Nan Yuan". In August, she released the album of the same name "Su Yunying".

In 2022, Su sang the episode song "Darling Darling" of the TV series "The Oath of Love".

Philanthropy 
In 2016, Su Yunying was invited to participate in Chengdu IFS activity "Originality Never Changes, Let Love Shine" and sang "Yezi" and "Fireflies". Su also participated in a rose charity sale with the executive editor of magazine "OK! Wonderful". Both event were part of Operation Smile's 25th anniversary series in China. The rose sale benefited children with cleft lip and cleft palate and other head and facial deformities from poor families. All proceeds from the sale are used for their follow-up medical care.

In 2018, Su Yunying attended the "123 Easyfunding Charity Gala" and won the annual Model Charity Power Award.

Awards and nominations

Discography

Studio albums

Singles

Evaluation 
Born in Sanya, Hainan, the singer who is affectionately called ‘pixie’ by fans has lived with nature at large since young, and refers to her hometown as very ‘passionate’. This point is reflected in her compositions, just like her hit song "Wild child" which she sang on the stage of a Chinese reality show; without the restrictions and trappings of society, one is instead able to sing even more freely.

"Start from the music and tell everyone what I'm doing" 

Su Yunying writes songs in a very special way. The words and melody come out together, 100 percent concentrated, and she can not hear others talking. "I like to swim through these ideas, wow, I can still be so."

"Some words and fixed words don't nail my mind, so I put the pictures and words I want together."

"This is the kind of girl she is, crazy and weird. While speaking, her expression changes constantly, and her ideas jump, at one point offering her viewpoint on star signs, at other times earnestly pouring her heart out about a musician she loves."

"Because every type of music is just a way of expressing a lifestyle. The genres I like are varied, it’s not just about Rap, Jazz or Reggae, even musical theatre music I really like. At the moment I want to try everything."

Music critic Erdi once commented like this: " What a living life is hidden in this voice! Strange, tricky, as if a fleeing spirit, floating across the sea into Su Yunying's body, the elf, called the wild son."

People with insufficient imagination can not understand Su Yunying's song: melody ups and downs, gorgeous words, bright and beautiful voice. At the end of each time, the voice trembled, like a wild horse, and suddenly broke free from the rein."It may have something to do with emotions, and I tell you in my voice that my emotions are arrived."

References

External links
Sony Music page

Chinese women singer-songwriters
Chinese Mandopop singers
1991 births
Living people
Singers from Hainan
People from Sanya
21st-century Chinese women singers